KNFM (92.3 FM), branded as "Lonestar 92.3", is a country music-formatted radio station that serves the Midland–Odessa metropolitan area of Texas, United States. The station is under ownership of Townsquare Media. Its studios are located on Highway 191 just west of Midland (its city of license) in rural Midland County.

KNFM broadcasts with 100,000 watts from the top of the KPEJ-TV Fox 24 tower near Gardendale and has center of radiation of 985 feet making it the largest FM signal in the Permian Basin.

References

External links
Lonestar 92's official website

Country radio stations in the United States
NFM
Townsquare Media radio stations